The Grand Couloir is a couloir on the Aiguille du Goûter. At  altitude this gully has to be traversed on foot, to reach the scramble beyond the Tête Rousse Hut up to the Goûter Refuge on the Goûter Route on Mont Blanc .

Accidents
This area is a well-known accident black spot in dry conditions, when there is little or no snow on the face binding the loose surface rocks together. Stonefall can be channelled down the gully to present a serious hazard to climbers crossing in between the relative safety of the sides. For this reputation this passage is sometimes even dubbed the "couloir de la mort", "corridor of death" or "gully of death". To this is eagerly referred by the press in more or less sensationalist reports on accidents that frequently happen at or around this spot during the summer climbing season Especially the place of the traverse is a site of many fatal accidents and numerous narrow escapes on the popular Goûter Route. The risky crossing has even been dramatically compared with Russian roulette.

This formed one of the main reasons for the permit system regulation introduced in 2019, which limited the daily number of climbers allowed.

A study describing the situation as "The Gouter Problem" mentions that 75% of the rockfalls at the spot occur between 10 am and 4 pm, with on average one event of rock fall every 17 minutes between 11 am and 12 am.

From 1990 to 2011, the French mountain police force registers show 291 rescue operations in the Goûter couloir, which resulted in 74 deaths and 180 injuries and from 1990 to 2017 347 rescue operations here, related to accidents which resulted in 102 deaths and 230 injuries.

During the extremely hot summer of 2015, the Goûter Hut was even temporarily closed on prefectural order to dissuade climbers from taking this route.

Accident prevention
Since 2009, the Petzl Foundation financed an accident prevention study project focusing mainly on this spot. The company also published a leaflet to inform climbers.
 The local geomorphological conditions became subject of study of several geotechnical experts. After the season of 2017, also the suggestion of a complete removal of the metal cables was considered, which would offer inexperienced climbers "false security".

Since the climbing season of 2019, to improve safety, the itinerary up and down the Goûter ridge is provided with a luminescent marking, dividing between separate up (ascent) and down (descent) routes.

External links
 Climbing Mont Blanc: 10 reasons to think twice

References 

 01
Mont Blanc
Mont Blanc
Mont Blanc massif